This is a list of area codes in the Commonwealth of Virginia, with date of establishment in parentheses:

 276 — Southwest corner of the state including Bristol, Galax, Martinsville, and Wytheville (1 September 2001 as split from 540).
 434 — South central area including Charlottesville and Lynchburg (1 June 2001 as split from 804).
 540/826 — Central and North  including Fredericksburg, Roanoke, Warrenton, and Winchester (15 July 1995 as split from 703).
 571/703 — Northern Virginia including the cities of Alexandria, Fairfax, and Falls Church as well as Arlington, Fairfax, and Loudoun counties (703 created October 1947 as original area code for Virginia; 571 created as overlay 1 March 2000)
 757/948 — Hampton Roads region and Southeast corner including Hampton, Newport News, Williamsburg, Virginia Beach, Norfolk, Chesapeake, Portsmouth, and the Eastern Shore on the Delmarva Peninsula (757 was established 1 July 1996 as split from 804; 948 is a planned overlay effective 9 May 2022)
 804  — Eastern Central Virginia the Northern Neck, and the Middle Peninsula including Mechanicsville, Petersburg, and Richmond (24 June 1973 as split from 703).

See also

 
Virginia
Area codes